Lipe is a settlement in the marshland south of Ljubljana in central Slovenia. It belongs to the City Municipality of Ljubljana. The area is part of the traditional Lower Carniola region. It is now included with the rest of the municipality in the Central Slovenia Statistical Region.

References

External links

Lipe on Geopedia

Populated places in the City Municipality of Ljubljana
Rudnik District